Kyriakos Kivrakidis (born 21 July 1992) is a Greek professional footballer who plays as a right-back for Super League club Atromitos.

Club career 

On January transfer window of 2014, he joined Atromitos from Gamma Ethniki club Aiginiakos. On 3 March 2014, he made his debut for the first team in a home game against Panionios. In 21 August 2017, he scored his first goal in the Superleague with the club in a 1–1 home draw against Apollon Smyrni.
On 1 October 2017, he scored with a header helping his club to win 1–0 champions Olympiacos at Karaiskakis Stadium. It was his second goal with the club in the Superleague. On 8 April 2019, Kivrakidis scored the game’s only goal as Atromitos defeated SuperLeague basement club Apollon Smyrni 1–0 to move three points clear of Aris in fourth spot.

Career statistics

References

External links
 

1992 births
Living people
Greek footballers
Association football defenders
Aiginiakos F.C. players
Atromitos F.C. players
Iraklis Thessaloniki F.C. players
Football League (Greece) players
Super League Greece players
Footballers from Berlin